In Greek mythology, Thrasybule or Thrasyboule (Ancient Greek: Θρασυβούλης) was the mother by King Iphitos of Schedius and Epistrophus, the leaders of the Phocians during the Trojan War. Otherwise,  the mother of these men were Hippolyte.

Notes

References 

 Apollodorus, The Library with an English Translation by Sir James George Frazer, F.B.A., F.R.S. in 2 Volumes, Cambridge, MA, Harvard University Press; London, William Heinemann Ltd. 1921. ISBN 0-674-99135-4. Online version at the Perseus Digital Library. Greek text available from the same website.
 Tzetzes, John, Allegories of the Iliad translated by Goldwyn, Adam J. and Kokkini, Dimitra. Dumbarton Oaks Medieval Library, Harvard University Press, 2015. 

Women in Greek mythology
Characters in Greek mythology